Kyzylyarovo (Qıźılyar) is a rural locality (a village) in Abzanovsky Selsoviet, Arkhangelsky District, Bashkortostan, Russia. The population was 127 as of 2010. There are 3 streets.

Geography 
Kyzylyarovo is located 17 km northwest of Arkhangelskoye (the district's administrative centre) by road. Asy is the nearest rural locality.

References 

Rural localities in Arkhangelsky District